Sant'Antonio Abate is a commune in the Metropolitan City of Naples in the Italian region Campania.

Sant'Antonio Abate may also refer to

Anthony the Great, a Christian monk and saint from Egypt 
Sant'Antonio Abate, Breno, a church in province of Brescia, Lombardy 
Sant'Antonio Abate, Francofonte, a church in province of Syracuse, Sicily 
Sant'Antonio Abate, Milan, a church in Milan, Lombardy
Sant'Antonio Abate, Naples, a church in Naples, Campania
Sant'Antonio Abate, Parma, a church in Parma, Emilia-Romagna
Sant'Antonio Abate, Pisa, a church in Pisa,Tuscany
Sant'Antonio Abate all'Esquilino, a church in Rome, Lazio

See also 
 Abate (disambiguation)
 Sant'Antonio (disambiguation)
 San Antonio Abad (disambiguation)